Clariger is a genus of gobies native to the northwestern Pacific Ocean from coastal waters and tide pools around Japan and Taiwan.

Species
There are currently five recognized species in this genus:
 Clariger chionomaculatus Shiogaki, 1988
 Clariger cosmurus D. S. Jordan & Snyder, 1901
 Clariger exilis Snyder, 1911
 Clariger papillosus Ebina, 1935
 Clariger taiwanensis Jang-Liaw, Y. H. Gong & I. S. Chen, 2012

References

Gobionellinae
Taxa named by David Starr Jordan